Mustafa Mauludi is a kurdish politician and the ex-leader of Kurdistan Democratic Party (Iran). He was selected as leader by central committee of KDP (Iran) on 15 January 2017 after resignation of Khaled Azizi.

Early life and education 
He was born in 1958 from Naqadeh, a city of West Azerbaijan Province. He graduated in Law from the university of Koya.

References

Kurdistan Democratic Party politicians
1959 births
Living people